At least eight of the 45 men who have held the office of United States president have been left-handed. Only one U.S. president prior to the 20th century was known to be left-handed. Since World War II there have been fourteen different U.S. presidents and six of them have been left-handed.

Various theories about why left-handers are overrepresented among U.S. presidents have been proposed. Biologist Amar Klar studied handedness and determined that left-handed people, "...have a wider scope of thinking". In a 2019 Journal of Neurosurgery article Nathan R. Selden argued that since left-handed people are right-hemisphere–dominant individuals, this might make presidents, "more effective leaders or at least more effective political candidates". A University of British Columbia psychology professor, Stanley Coren, authored the book The Left-Handed Syndrome, in which he claimed that "left-handers actually have a profile that works very well for a politician". In a 2021 Business Insider article titled, "From Barack Obama to Julius Caesar, here are 12 world leaders who were left-handed" reporters Alexandra Ma and Talia Lakritz state, "According to some research, lefties may be more creative, be better at 'divergent thinking' — generating new ideas based on existing information — and face challenges better."

On the other hand, medical researcher Jonathan Belsey argued that, given a 13% prevalence of left-handedness, the long-term average is not statistically high, but rather has a p-value of 0.77, and that even the post-1881 prevalence has a 0.10 likelihood of occurring by chance.

Left-handed presidents of the United States 
James A. Garfield (March 4, 1881 – September 19, 1881) was ambidextrous; he was the only known left-handed president prior to the 20th century.
Herbert Hoover (March 4, 1929 – March 4, 1933) was known to be left-handed.
Harry S. Truman (April 12, 1945 – January 20, 1953) was left-handed as a child, he wrote with his right hand and used his left for most other activities.
Gerald Ford (August 9, 1974 – January 20, 1977) was left handed.
Ronald Reagan (January 20, 1981 – January 20, 1989) was naturally left-handed but wrote with his right hand.
George H. W. Bush (January 20, 1989 – January 20, 1993) was left-handed. All three major candidates for president in 1992 were left-handed: Bill Clinton won.
Bill Clinton (January 20, 1993 – January 20, 2001) is left-handed.
Barack Obama (January 20, 2009 – January 20, 2017) is left-handed.

Other presidents who demonstrated left-handed ability 
Thomas Jefferson (March 4, 1801 – March 4, 1809) was right handed but after an injury to his right wrist, he wrote with his left hand. He was said to have been ambidextrous, and he could write equally well with either hand.
Woodrow Wilson (March 4, 1913 – March 4, 1921) was right handed but after a stroke Wilson was able to use his left hand to write "perfectly legible well formed characters". His ability was called "remarkable neurologically".

See also 

 List of presidents of the United States

References

Further reading 

Right brain? Hemispheric dominance and the United States presidency JNS Nathan R. Selden MD, PhD

Lists of people by physical attribute
Lists relating to the United States presidency